is a Japanese speed skater. She competed at the 1998 Winter Olympics and the 2002 Winter Olympics.

References

External links

1974 births
Living people
Japanese female speed skaters
Olympic speed skaters of Japan
Speed skaters at the 1998 Winter Olympics
Speed skaters at the 2002 Winter Olympics
People from Kushiro, Hokkaido